The following article is a summary of the 2016 Indonesia national football team results.

Men's Senior Football Team

Record

Managers of 2016
Included just matches against country.

Goal scorers

Fixtures and result

Friendly Matches

International Friendly 

Source:

2016 AFF Championship

Group A

Semi-finals

First Leg

Second Leg

Finals

First Leg

Second Leg

Men's under-19 Football Team

Record

Managers of 2016
Included just matches against country.

Goal scorers

Fixtures and results

Friendly Matches

International Friendly 
Source:

Non-International Friendly (against clubs)

2016 AFF U-19 Youth Championship

Group B

References

Indonesia
2016